Scrofella is a monotypic genus of flowering plants belonging to the family Plantaginaceae. The only species is Scrofella chinensis.

Its native range is Western and Central China.

References

Plantaginaceae
Plantaginaceae genera
Monotypic Lamiales genera